Alzona may refer to:
 Encarnacion Alzona (March 23, 1895 – March 13, 2001) was a pioneering Filipino historian, educator and suffragist
 Cesar Alzona (Sept 15, 1926-June 27, 1997) Laguna, Philippines, is the author of the original first Philippine Marines Hymn